Gastón de la Cerda, 3rd Duke of Medinaceli, Grandee of Spain, (in full), (c. 1507 – 1552) was a Spanish nobleman.

He was the second son of Don Juan de la Cerda, 2nd Duke of Medinaceli, by first wife Mencía Manuel de Portugal. As a young man he became a monk in the Order of St. Jerome. In 1536 after the death of his elder brother Luis without issue he became the heir to the family titles, so he sought a Papal dispensation in order to marry and fulfill his family obligations. On 4 March 1540 he married María Sarmiento de la Cerda, a marriage that was eventually annulled on 30 August 1544, without issue.

Sources

1507 births
1552 deaths
Dukes of Medinaceli
Marquesses of Cogolludo
Counts of Puerto de Santa María
House of Medinaceli
Knights Hospitaller
Grandees of Spain